The Duke of Gloucester Barracks is a British Army barracks at South Cerney in Gloucestershire. The site is also home to the Joint Air Mounting Centre.

History
The barracks were established, on the site of the former RAF South Cerney, in 1971, when UK (Support) Postal and Courier Communications Unit, Royal Engineers (re-designated 2 Postal and Courier Regiment RE (2 PC Regt RE) in 1979) and 29 Transport and Movement Regiment of the Royal Corps of Transport (now 29 Postal Courier & Movement Regiment of the Royal Logistic Corps) moved there.

Based units 
The following notable units are based at Duke of Gloucester Barracks.

British Army 
Royal Logistic Corps

 104th Logistic Support Brigade
 Headquarters 104th Logistic Support Brigade
 Joint Air Mounting Centre
 29 Postal Courier & Movement Regiment
 55 Headquarters Squadron
 50 Postal Courier and Movement Control Squadron
 59 Postal Courier and Movement Control Squadron
 69 Postal Courier and Movement Control Squadron
 80 Postal Courier and Movement Control Squadron
 99 Postal Courier and Movement Control Squadron

Role and operations

Royal Logistic Corps 
The barracks are currently occupied by 29 Postal Courier & Movement Regiment, part of the 104th Logistic Support Brigade of the Royal Logistic Corps (RLC), and coming under the umbrella of Force Troops Command. The regiment's role is movements support and postal & courier capabilities. As of 1 November 2018, there was 481 personnel assigned to the regiment.

The headquarters of the 104th Logistic Support Brigade is also based at the barracks. The brigade directs the Army’s logistics enabling capabilities which include postal and courier services, movement control, port and maritime movements, operational hygiene, mortuary arrangements, catering, fuel storage & distribution and equipment & recovery support.

Joint Air Mounting Centre 
The Joint Air Mounting Centre (JAMC) comes under the command of the 104th Logistic Support Brigade and is managed by 29 Regiment, alongside Royal Air Force personnel. It handles processing, security and baggage checks for all British troops embarking overseas on exercise or operational deployment, before they are transported by road to RAF Brize Norton for departure from the UK. This allows more efficient processing of personnel and freight and relieves pressure at Brize Norton, which is located some around 30 miles away in Oxfordshire.

References

Barracks in England
Installations of the British Army